The Battle of the Villa Fiorita is a 1965 British drama film, based on the 1963 novel by Rumer Godden, directed by Delmer Daves. It stars Maureen O'Hara and Rossano Brazzi.

This was the last film for Delmer Daves who, two years earlier, wrote, produced and directed another film in which Maureen O'Hara played the female lead, Spencer's Mountain. His retirement lasted twelve years, until his death in 1977. This is the first film for Argentina-born English actress Olivia Hussey who, three years later, played Juliet in Franco Zeffirelli's Romeo and Juliet.

Synopsis
In Italy, two children, Michael (Martin Stephens) and Debbie (Elizabeth Dear), are aware that their mother, Moira (Maureen O'Hara), has left them for a lover, a famous Italian composer, and they are staying at the Villa Fiorita. Michael convinces Debbie to run away to the Villa to fetch their mother, and forces her to sell her prized pony to afford the journey. They arrive, and the lover, Lorenzo (Rossano Brazzi), calls their father to inform him that the children have run away and that he will be sending them home. However, Michael falls ill and Lorenzo allows them both to stay. Debbie joins forces with Donna, the daughter of their mother's lover, to manipulate Moira into returning to Britain. A hunger strike by the girls ensues which fails and culminates in Moira slapping Debbie and Lorenzo spanking Donna. Lorenzo finally decides to send the children home but Michael and Donna attempt to run away on a sailboat during a storm. After the two nearly drown, Moira and Lorenzo agree that they have lost the battle, and a heartbroken Moira returns to England with her children.

Cast
 Maureen O'Hara as Moira
 Rossano Brazzi as Lorenzo
 Richard Todd as Darrell
 Phyllis Calvert as Margot
 Martin Stephens as Michael
 Elizabeth Dear as Debbie
 Olivia Hussey as Donna
 Maxine Audley as Charmian
 Ursula Jeans as Lady Anthea
 Ettore Manni as Father Rossi 
 Richard Wattis as Travel Agent
 Finlay Currie as Concert emcee
 Clelia Matania as Celestina

Home media
Warner Bros. has released the film for digital streaming through Vudu and Amazon Prime Video, albeit in standard definition.

References

External links
 
 

1960s English-language films
1965 drama films
1965 films
British drama films
Films based on British novels
Films based on works by Rumer Godden
Films directed by Delmer Daves
Films set in Italy
Warner Bros. films
1960s British films